Bélmez de la Moraleda, or simply Bélmez, is a city located in the province of Jaén, Andalusia, southern Spain. It has a population of 1833 inhabitants.

Bélmez is well known as the location for a famous house purported to be haunted by apparitions that manifest as images of human faces in the foundation.

References

External links 
http://www.thecobrasnose.com/xxghost/belmez.html

Municipalities in the Province of Jaén (Spain)